Allyn Ann McLerie (December 1, 1926 – May 21, 2018) was a Canadian-born American actress, singer and dancer who worked with many of Golden Age musical theatre's major choreographers, including George Balanchine, Agnes de Mille, and Jerome Robbins.

Life and career
McLerie was born in Grand-Mère, Quebec, Canada, the only child of Vera Alma MacTaggart (née Stewart) and Allan Gordon McLerie, an aviator and WWI veteran . Allan Gordon McLerie died of a heart attack four months before his daughter's birth, and Allyn Ann McLerie moved with her widowed mother to the United States at age one. (McLerie's mother, Vera, died on her daughter's 54th birthday in 1980 at age 83.) Allyn studied dancing at a studio in Bay Ridge, Brooklyn, and made her Broadway debut as a teenager in Kurt Weill's One Touch of Venus.

She went on to replace Sono Osato as Ivy in On the Town, then played Amy Spettigue in the 1948 Broadway production of Where's Charley? (Theatre World Award).

A life member of The Actors Studio, McLerie's other Broadway credits include Miss Liberty, the drama Time Limit, Redhead (understudying Gwen Verdon), and West Side Story. 

McLerie's film roles include Amy in Where's Charley? (1952); Katie Brown in Calamity Jane (1953); Shirley in They Shoot Horses, Don't They? (1969); and The Crazy Woman in Jeremiah Johnson (1972). Other film work includes Phantom of the Rue Morgue (1954), The Cowboys (1972), The Way We Were (1973), Cinderella Liberty (1973), All the President's Men (1976), and TV movies such as Born Innocent (1974) and Death Scream (1975).

She enjoyed a long career as a character actress on television, making frequent guest appearances on shows such as Bonanza, The Waltons, The Love Boat, Barney Miller, Benson, Hart to Hart, St. Elsewhere, and Dynasty, among many others. She played Miss Janet Reubner, Tony Randall's acerbic  and priggish secretary, on The Tony Randall Show (1976–78).

McLerie played the recurring role of Arthur Carlson's wife Carmen on WKRP in Cincinnati (1978–82).  Though then in her mid-fifties, McLerie was playing a character about a decade younger, as Carmen gave birth to a daughter in a 1980 episode.  McLerie also appeared in three episodes of Punky Brewster alongside her husband, George Gaynes (1984). She later appeared as Florence Bickford, the title character's mother on The Days and Nights of Molly Dodd (1987–91). Her last role was on an episode of Brooklyn Bridge in 1993.

Personal life
McLerie was married to the lyricist/librettist Adolph Green from 1945 until their divorce in May 1953. She was also married to actor George Gaynes from 1953 until his death in 2016. The couple had two children, Matt Gaynes and Iya Gaynes Falcone Brown.

McLerie died at her home in North Bend, Washington, on May 21, 2018, at the age of 91, from Alzheimer's disease.

Filmography

References

External links
 
 
 

1926 births
2018 deaths
20th-century American actresses
Actresses from New York City
American female dancers
American women singers
American film actresses
American musical theatre actresses
American stage actresses
American television actresses
Canadian emigrants to the United States
Dancers from New York (state)
Deaths from Alzheimer's disease
Neurological disease deaths in Washington (state)
20th-century American dancers
21st-century American women